Amarillo (Spanish for "yellow") is a city in the U.S. state of Texas and the seat of Potter County. It is the 14th-most populous city in Texas and the largest city in the Texas Panhandle. A portion of the city extends into Randall County. The estimated population of Amarillo was 200,393 as of April 1, 2020. The Amarillo-Pampa-Borger combined statistical area had an estimated population of 308,297 as of 2020.

The city of Amarillo, originally named Oneida, is situated in the Llano Estacado region. The availability of the railroad and freight service provided by the Fort Worth and Denver City Railroad contributed to the city's growth as a cattle-marketing center in the late 19th century.

Amarillo was once the self-proclaimed "Helium Capital of the World" for having one of the country's most productive helium fields. The city is also known as "The Yellow Rose of Texas" (as the city takes its name from the Spanish word for yellow), "Yellow City" for its name, and "Rotor City, USA" for its V-22 Osprey hybrid aircraft assembly plant. Amarillo operates one of the largest meat-packing areas in the United States. Pantex, the only nuclear weapons assembly and disassembly facility in the country, is also a major employer. The location of this facility also gave rise to the nickname "Bomb City". The attractions Cadillac Ranch, and Big Texan Steak Ranch are located adjacent to Interstate 40. U.S. Highway 66 also passed through the city.

History

During April 1887, J. I. Berry established a site for a town after he chose a well-watered section along the way of the Fort Worth and Denver City Railroad, which had begun building across the Texas Panhandle. Berry and Colorado City, Texas, merchants wanted to make their new town site the region's main trading center. On August 30, 1887, Berry's town site won the county seat election and was established in Potter County. Availability of the railroad and freight service after the county seat election made the town a fast-growing cattle-marketing center.

The settlement originally was called Oneida; it later changed its name to Amarillo, which probably derived from yellow wildflowers that were plentiful during the spring and summer or the nearby Amarillo Lake and Amarillo Creek, named in turn for the yellow soil along their banks and shores (Amarillo is the Spanish word for the color yellow). Early residents originally pronounced the city's name more similar to the Spanish pronunciation  , which was later displaced by the current pronunciation.

On June 19, 1888, Henry B. Sanborn, who is given credit as the "Father of Amarillo", and his business partner Joseph F. Glidden began buying land to the east to move Amarillo after arguing that Berry's site was on low ground and would flood during rainstorms. Sanborn also offered to trade lots in the new location to businesses in the original city's site and help with the expense of moving to new buildings. His incentives gradually won over people, who moved their businesses to Polk Street in the new commercial district. Heavy rains almost flooded Berry's part of the town in 1889, prompting more people to move to Sanborn's location. This eventually led to another county seat election making Sanborn's town the new county seat in 1893.

By the late 1890s, Amarillo had emerged as one of the world's busiest cattle-shipping points, and its population grew significantly. The city became a grain elevator, milling, and feed-manufacturing center after an increase in production of wheat and small grains during the early 1900s. Discovery of natural gas in 1918 and oil three years later brought oil and gas companies to the Amarillo area.

The United States government bought the Cliffside Gas Field with high helium content in 1927 and the Federal Bureau of Mines began operating the Amarillo Helium plant two years later. The plant was the sole producer of commercial helium in the world for a number of years. The U.S. National Helium Reserve is stored in the Bush Dome Reservoir at the Cliffside facility.

Following the lead of the Fort Worth and Denver City Railroad, the Atchison, Topeka and Santa Fe Railway and Chicago, Rock Island and Pacific Railroad established services to and from Amarillo. Each of these three carriers maintained substantial freight and passenger depots and repair facilities in the city through most of the 20th century and were major employers within the community.

Amarillo was hit by the Dust Bowl and entered an economic depression. U.S. Routes 60, 87, 287, and 66 intersected at Amarillo, making it a major tourist stop with numerous motels, restaurants, and curio shops. World War II led the establishment of Amarillo Army Air Field in east Amarillo and the nearby Pantex Army Ordnance Plant, which produced bombs and ammunition. After the end of the war, both of the facilities were closed. The Pantex Plant was reopened in 1950 and produced nuclear weapons throughout the Cold War.

In 1949, a deadly F4 tornado devastated much of Amarillo, shortly after nightfall on May 15, tearing through the south and east sides of the city, killing seven people, and injuring more than 80 others. The tornado touched down southwest of Amarillo, near the town of Hereford, then tracked its way northward, on a collision course with Amarillo. The tornado, shortly after 8 pm, ripped through Amarillo's most densely populated areas, demolishing almost half of the city, causing catastrophic damage and loss of life.

In 1951, the army air base was reactivated as Amarillo Air Force Base and expanded to accommodate a Strategic Air Command B-52 Stratofortress wing. The arrival of servicemen and their families ended the city's depression. Between 1950 and 1960, Amarillo's population grew from 74,443 to 137,969. However, the closure of Amarillo Air Force Base on December 31, 1968, contributed to a decrease in population to 127,010 by 1970.

In 1970, the U.S. Census Bureau reported Amarillo's population as 6.1% Hispanic and 88.5% non-Hispanic white. In the 1980s, ASARCO, Iowa Beef Processors (present day Tyson Foods), Owens-Corning, and Weyerhaeuser built plants at Amarillo. The Eastridge neighborhood houses many immigrants from countries such as Vietnam, Laos, and Burma. Many of them found employment at the nearby Iowa Beef Processors plant. The following decade, Amarillo's city limits encompassed  in Potter and Randall Counties. Interstate 27 highway connecting Lubbock to Amarillo was built mostly during the 1980s.

In May 1982, a strong F3 tornado struck Amarillo's western suburbs, devastating parts of Dawn, and Bushland. No fatalities were reported.

Amarillo has celebrated National CleanUp Day on the third Saturday of September annually since 2018.

Geography and climate

Amarillo is located near the middle of the Texas Panhandle. It does not share similar weather characteristics with south and east Texas. It is situated in the grasslands of the Texas Panhandle, and is surrounded by dense prairie. Amarillo is infamous for its unpredictable weather patterns, with massive temperature changes on a daily basis, raging winds, devastating hailstorms and "northers", long periods of drought, late frosts, spring tornadoes, dust-storms, and floods.

Though urbanization, agricultural farming, and construction have occurred over the last century in and around Amarillo, the native grasslands that dominate this region have remained largely untouched. Amarillo sits closer in proximity to the Oklahoma, New Mexico and Colorado state capitals than it does to Austin. The region's surface is relatively flat and has little soil drainage. Due to the lack of developed drainage, much of the rainfall either evaporates, infiltrates into the ground, or accumulates in playa lakes. The Amarillo metropolitan area covers four counties: Armstrong, Carson, Potter, and Randall.

The southern divide of the Western High Plains is the Llano Estacado or Staked Plains geographical region. The river is dammed to form Lake Meredith, a major source of drinking water in the Texas Panhandle region. The city is situated near the Panhandle Field, in a productive gas and oil area, covering  in Hartley, Potter, Moore, Hutchinson, Carson, Gray, Wheeler, and Collingsworth Counties. The Potter County portion had the nation's largest natural gas reserve. The tallest peak is reported to be  underground in northeast Potter County under the Alibates Flint Quarries National Monument.

Cityscape
Most of Amarillo's population growth and commercial development are occurring in the southern and northwestern parts of the city. Similar to many towns in the Texas Panhandle, the city's downtown has suffered economic deterioration throughout the years. To help revitalize it, the organization Center City of Amarillo was formed to establish partnerships with groups who have a large presence in the city. Since its conception in the 1990s, Center City has sponsored public art projects and started block parties in the downtown area.

The 31-story FirstBank Southwest Tower was opened in Amarillo's downtown in 1971. Completed in the same year as the FirstBank Southwest Tower, the Amarillo National Bank Plaza One building houses the headquarters of Amarillo National Bank, the city's largest financial institution. The Santa Fe Building, completed in 1930, was the regional offices of the Atchison, Topeka and Santa Fe Railway, but was vacant for several years until Potter County bought the building for $426,000 in 1995 to gain new office spaces.

Amarillo's historic homes and buildings listed on the National Register of Historic Places reflect the economic growth from around 1900 to the start of World War II. Polk Street contains many of the city's historic downtown buildings and homes. The large historic homes on this street were built close to downtown, and homes were located on the west side of the street as a symbol of status because they would be greeted with the sunrise every morning.

The city of Amarillo's Parks and Recreation Department operates over 50 municipal parks, including a skatepark west of the city. Amarillo's largest parks are Medical Park, Thompson Memorial Park, and Memorial Park, near Amarillo College's Washington Street Campus. From 1978 to 2002, the Junior League of Amarillo and the city of Amarillo's Parks and Recreation Department co-sponsored Funfest, a family entertainment festival, benefiting the city parks and the league's Community Chest Trust Fund. Funfest was held in Thompson Memorial Park during Memorial Day weekend. At the time, the festival included Amarillo's only  foot race, the Funfest Marathon.

Tallest buildings

Climate

Like most of the Texas Panhandle, Amarillo has a temperate semi-arid climate (Köppen climate classification BSk). Both the city and most of the county as a whole lie in USDA Plant Hardiness Zone 7a. Amarillo is characterized by a winter season featuring large diurnal temperature variation, great day-to-day variability, possible sudden and/or severe Arctic air outbreaks (in Texas, called "blue northers"), possible blizzards and hot summers with generally low humidity. Much of Amarillo's precipitation falls during heavy convective showers and thunderstorms during the late spring and summer months.

According to 'Cities Ranked and Rated' (Bert Sperling and Peter Sander), Amarillo averages 48 days per year during which thunder and lightning is reported. This is above the national average. These storms can be severe: Amarillo and the Texas Panhandle are situated in the western portion of "Tornado Alley" and are prone to severe weather events, occurring primarily between April and July. Severe thunderstorms can produce damaging straight-line winds, large hail, tornadoes, and flash flooding. Amarillo is no stranger to devastating tornadoes. Tornadoes have occurred in and around the city in 1968, 1970, 1982, 1986, 2001, 2007, and most recently in 2013, 2015 and 2016. The strongest tornado to ever hit Amarillo was a deadly F4 tornado that struck the city in the night time hours of May 15, 1949. Amarillo suffered a direct hit, causing catastrophic damage and loss of life in Amarillo's most densely populated areas. The tornado devastated the south and east sides of the city, killing 7 people, and injuring more than 80 others. Sunny weather prevails year-round, with nearly 3300 hours of bright sunshine annually. The National Weather Service in Amarillo forecasts and provides climatic data for the city.

On average, there are 5.9 days of lows at or below , 8.8 days where the temperature fails to rise above freezing, and 61 days of + highs. Unlike in the Rio Grande Valley or eastern portions of Texas, days where the low does not fall below  are relatively rare, due to the aridity and elevation. Blizzards occur occasionally, but snowfall is typically light, averaging nearly  seasonally and the median figure is near . Amarillo is also recorded as the windiest city in the U.S. by the Weather Channel.

Notes

Demographics

According to the 2020 United States census, there were 200,393 people, 76,778 households, and 50,005 families residing in the city, an increase of 5.1% since the 2010 United States census. At the 2010 U.S. census, there were 190,695 people residing in Amarillo, an increase of 9.8% since the 2000 U.S. census.

In 2020, there were 76,778 households with an average of 2.57 people per household. Of the households, 60.8% lived in owner-occupied housing units and the median value of an owner-occupied housing unit was $140,030. The median homeowner costs with a mortgage were $1,272 and without a mortgage $479. Amarillo had a median gross rent of $876 from 2016 to 2020. Amarillo had a median household income of $52,941 and per capita income at $28,274. An estimated 15.4% of the population lived at or below the poverty line.

In 2020, there were 78,706 occupied households, out of which 26,945 were married couples living together, 4,327 had a female householder with no spouse present, and 1,858 were male householder, no spouse present. The age distribution of the city in 2020 was as follows: 7.6% of the population was under the age of 5, 26.8% was under the age of 18, 73.2% 18 and older, 13.8% who were 65 years of age or older. The median age was 34.1 years.

The median income for a household in the city was $52,941, and the median income for a family was $64,632. Married-couple families had a median income of $80,819, and non-family households had a median income of $31,663. About 15.4% of families were below the poverty line, including 20% of those under age 18, 14.1% ages 18 – 64, and 12.2% of those age 65 or over.

Religion 
Part of the Bible Belt, Christianity is the predominant religion in Amarillo and its metropolitan area. There are more than 200 churches in the area as of 2013.

According to Sperling's BestPlaces in 2021, 77.83% of the population identified as religious, primarily adhering to Christianity. Out of the 77.83%, 74.53% identify as Christian. Baptists made up 40.2% of the Christian population and Catholics were 13.3% of the local population. Methodists and Pentecostals were the next largest Christian groups, followed by Presbyterians, Mormons, Episcopalians or Anglicans, and Lutherans. Approximately 8.1% of the population were of another Christian faith. In 2021, about 0.1% of Amarillo's residents identified with Judaism and 2.1% were Muslim. An estimated 1.1% followed an Eastern religion such as Buddhism or Hinduism. The closest Covenant of Unitarian Universalist Pagan meeting officially advertised is located a 5-hour plus drive in Denton, TX despite there being a UU congregation in Amarillo it does not host a CUUPs chapater.

Economy

Amarillo is considered the regional economic center for the Texas Panhandle, as well as Eastern New Mexico and the Oklahoma Panhandle. The meat packing industry is a major employer in Amarillo; about one-quarter of the United States' beef supply is processed in the area. The city is also the location of headquarters for the Texas Cattle Feeders Association. Petroleum extraction is also a major industry. The helium industry has decreased in significance since the federal government privatized local operations in the late 1990s. Bell Helicopter Textron opened a helicopter assembly plant near the city's international airport in 1999.

The city's largest employer in 2005 was Tyson Foods, with 3,700 employees. The Amarillo Independent School District was next with 3,659 employees followed by Pantex, Baptist St. Anthony's Health Care System, City of Amarillo, Northwest Texas Healthcare System, Amarillo College, Wal-mart, and United Supermarkets. Other major employers include Bell Helicopter Textron, Owens-Corning, Amarillo National Bank and ASARCO.

Approximately  of agricultural land surrounds the city with corn, wheat, and cotton as the primary crops. Other crops in the area include sorghum, silage, hay, and soybeans. The Texas Panhandle, particularly in Hereford, Texas, serves as a fast-growing milk producing area as several multimillion-dollar state of the art dairies were built in early 2000s.

The Amarillo Economic Development Corporation (AEDC) is funded by a city sales tax, and it provides aggressive incentive packages to existing and prospective employers. In the mid-to-late 1990s, the AEDC gained notoriety by sending mock checks to businesses across the country, placing full-page advertisements in The Wall Street Journal, and paying an annual $1 million subsidy to American Airlines to retain jet service. The AEDC is largely responsible for bringing Bell Helicopter Textron's development of the V-22 Osprey hybrid aircraft and the future site of Marine One assembly in Amarillo.

From 2020 to 2021, Amarillo experienced its greatest amount of economic development in 30 years. Amazon, Asset Protection Unit, and Texas Tech University Vet School were named some major organizations contributing to the city and metropolitan area's economic growth. Through the COVID-19 pandemic in Texas, the Amarillo Chamber of Commerce announced a new initiative to help local businesses rebound from the pandemic. Its tourism industry also rebounded.

Culture

Amarillo has a number of natural attractions near the city. The Palo Duro Canyon State Park is the United States' second largest canyon system, after the Grand Canyon and is located south of Amarillo. The canyon is a prominent mountain biking destination and hosts the annual 50-mile Palo Duro Canyon Trail Run. Palo Duro has a distinct hoodoo that resembles a lighthouse. It is once known as the site for prehistoric inhabitants to obtain flint in order to make tools and weapons.

Local millionaire Stanley Marsh 3 funded many public art projects in the city including the Cadillac Ranch, located west of Amarillo on Interstate 40, a monument of painted Cadillac automobiles that were dug into the ground head first. Marsh also participated in an ongoing art project called the Dynamite Museum, which consists of thousands of mock traffic signs. These signs, bearing messages such as "Road does not end" or displaying a random picture, are scattered throughout the city of Amarillo. Besides these works, one can find close to the city the final earthwork of Robert Smithson (and another commission by Marsh), Amarillo Ramp.

The city has events and attractions honoring the cowboy and Texas culture. During the third week of September, the Tri-State Fair & Rodeo brings participants mostly from Oklahoma, New Mexico and Texas to Amarillo since 1921. On the Tri-State Exposition grounds, the Amarillo National Center is a special events center for events ranging from national equestrian competitions to motor sports and rodeos. The World Championship Ranch Rodeo sponsored by the Working Ranch Cowboys Association is held every November in the Amarillo Civic Center. The Amarillo Livestock Auction on Bull Road holds a free-to-the-public cattle auction on Tuesdays. Now located on Interstate 40, The Big Texan Steak Ranch is famous by offering visitors a free 72 ounce (2 kg) beef steak if it (and its accompanying dinner) is eaten in under an hour.

Globe-News Center for the Performing Arts, opened in 2006, houses the Amarillo Opera, Amarillo Symphony, and Lone Star Ballet concerts. The facility, located just across the Amarillo Civic Center, features a 1,300-seat auditorium. The Globe-News Center was built in hope by city officials and others that it will revitalize the downtown area. The nonprofit community theater group, Amarillo Little Theatre, has its season run from September to May. The theater group's two facilities, the Mainstage and the Adventure Space, are located west of Amarillo's downtown. The Pioneer Amphitheater, located in nearby Palo Duro Canyon, is the setting for the outdoor musical drama Texas, which plays nightly during the summer. The musical depicts a story about the history of Texas Panhandle settlers throughout the years. In 2002, the producers changed its name to Texas Legacies after retiring the previous script that was used for 37 years for a more historically accurate one, but attendance declined over the next four seasons, so it was decided to revert to the original Paul Green script in 2006.

The Amarillo Public Library is affiliated with the Harrington Library Consortium. The consortium consist of public, college, and school libraries located in the Texas Panhandle that share resources and cooperate with one another. Other members include the Amarillo's public schools, Amarillo College, Canyon Area Library, Lovett Memorial Library in Pampa, Texas, and Hutchinson County Library in Borger, Texas. The Amarillo Public Library's main branch is located in downtown and operates four neighborhood branches.

Wonderland Amusement Park is located in northern Amarillo at Thompson Park, named for Ernest Thompson. The park also houses the Amarillo zoo and offers picnicking.

Amarillo residents are known as Amarilloans. Notable Amarilloans include actress Ann Doran (1911–2000), old-style journalist Bascom N. Timmons, the Dory Funk wrestling family, former UFC Champions Heath Herring and Evan Tanner, astronaut Rick Husband, professional golfer Ryan Palmer, rockabilly pioneer Buddy Knox, actress Carolyn Jones, actress and dancer Cyd Charisse, actor and poet Harry Northup, State Senator Max Sherman, Republican state chairman Tom Mechler, politicians Beau Boulter and John Marvin Jones, businessman T. Boone Pickens, Jr., singer-songwriter J. D. Souther, gambler Thomas "Amarillo Slim" Preston, soldier and interior decorator Clyde Kenneth Harris, and music artist and composer Terry Stafford ("Amarillo by Morning"; "Suspicion"). Singer Lacey Brown of Amarillo advanced to the top 24 in season 8 on the hit show American Idol. She returned to the show again in season 9 and advanced to the top 12 but was eliminated from the program on March 17, 2010. Former residents Evander "Ziggy" Hood and Montrel Meander are in the National Football League.

Museums and art collections
The American Quarter Horse Association (AQHA) is an international organization dedicated to the preservation, improvement and record-keeping of the American Quarter Horse breed. The organization is headquartered in Amarillo and has a museum. There is also an American Quarter Horse Hall of Fame exhibited in the museum. In addition, the AQHA and Center City of Amarillo co-sponsors the project, "Hoof Prints of the American Quarter Horse" which consist of horse statues located in front of several Amarillo businesses, such as the downtown Amarillo National building, Nationwide Insurance, and Edward Jones. An area business would purchase a horse statue and a local artist paints on it.

Two of the Amarillo area's higher education institutions have at least one museum in their campuses. The Amarillo Art Center , opened in 1972, is a building complex with the Amarillo Museum of Art (AMoA) and concert hall located on the Washington Street Campus of Amarillo College. Located on the campus of West Texas A&M University, the Panhandle-Plains Historical Museum claims to be the largest historical museum in Texas.

Don Harrington Discovery Center, located in the city's hospital district, is an interactive science center and space theater with over 60 hands-on exhibits. Outside of the building is a steel structure called the Helium Monument which has time capsules and designates Amarillo the "Helium Capital of the World." Near the proximity of the Discovery Center, the Amarillo Botanical Gardens has gardens, indoor exhibits, and a library for visitation throughout the year.

The Texas Pharmacy Museum claims to be the only Texas museum specialized in the research, collection, preservation, and exhibition of the history of pharmacy, is also located in the city's hospital district.

Founded in 2013, by businessman Tom Warren, The Amarillo Historical Museum is Amarillo's only local museum to exclusively feature local history.

Other notable museums in the area are the Kwahadi Kiva Indian Museum and the English Field Air & Space Museum. The Kwahadi Kiva Indian Museum features a collection of Native American artifacts and provides dance performances. The English Field Air & Space Museum, which had been operated by the Texas Aviation Historical Society featuring aircraft and space exhibits, in 2007 closed its doors and lost many of its aircraft. The museum is now rebuilding its aircraft collection as Texas Air & Space Museum and is located on American Drive on the south side of the airport.

Sports
The Lone Star Football League team Amarillo Venom and the NAHL Jr. A hockey team, the Amarillo Bulls both play in the Amarillo Civic Center. Amarillo previously hosted an independent league baseball team, the Amarillo Thunderheads of the American Association, which played its home games in Potter County Memorial Stadium from 2011 to 2015. The city was the home of the Double-A Amarillo Gold Sox Minor League Baseball team of the Texas League off and on from 1939 to 1982. In 2019, the Texas League's San Antonio Missions relocated to Amarillo as the Amarillo Sod Poodles and play at the $45.5 million Hodgetown. Amarillo had a minor league indoor soccer team called the Amarillo Challengers that competed in the SISL and later the USISL.

West Texas A&M University features a full slate of NCAA Division II teams; however, Amarillo College is one of the few community colleges in Texas without an athletic program. From 1968 to 1996, Amarillo hosted the annual National Women's Invitational Tournament (NWIT), a post season women's college basketball tournament. During high school football season, the Amarillo Independent School District schools' home games are in Dick Bivins Stadium which had a $5.7 million renovation in 2005. Randall High School (part of the adjacent Canyon Independent School District) plays its home games in Kimbrough Memorial Stadium in Canyon, as well as the yearly Clinton Invitational horseshoe tournament. River Road, Highland Park, and Bushland High Schools, also play football, in addition other sports.

Amarillo is home to the Amarillo Gun Club, which features a variety of clay target sports including trap, skeet and 5-Stand.

Another part of Amarillo's sporting history was its roots in professional wrestling. Amarillo residents Dory Funk, Stanley Blackburn and Doc Sarpolis promoted the territory for several decades. Funk's sons, Dory Funk, Jr., and Terry Funk were both National Wrestling Alliance World Heavyweight Champions and represented Amarillo.

Government

Local government
In 1913, Amarillo became the first Texas city and the fifth in United States to use the council-manager form of municipal government, with all governmental powers resting in a legislative body, called a council (before 2014, it was called a commission). Amarillo's commission is composed of five elected commissioners, one of whom is the mayor of the city. The mayor and each commissioner serves a two-year term. The role of the commission is to pass ordinances and resolutions, adopt regulations, and appoint city officials, including the city manager. While the mayor serves as a presiding officer of the commission, the city manager is the administrative head of the municipal government and is responsible for the administration of all departments. The city commission holds its regular meetings on Tuesday of each week.

 W. W. Wetsel, 1892–1894
 R. L. Stringfellow, 1899–1902
 S. Lightburne, 1902–1906
 Will A. Miller, Jr., 1906–1908
 Lon D. Marrs, 1908–1910 and 1917–1922
 James N. Patton, 1910–1912
 W. E. Gee, 1912–1913
 J. N. Beasley, 1913–1916
 Eugene S. Blasdel, 1923–1924
 Lee Bivins, 1925–1928
 Ernest O. Thompson, 1929–1932
 Ross D. Rogers, 1932–1941
 Joe A. Jenkins, 1941–1947
 L. R. Hagy, 1947–1949
 E. H. Klein, 1949–1953
 S. T. Curtis, 1953–1955
 R. C. Jordan, 1955–1957
 J. R. Armstrong, 1957–1959
 A. F. Madison, 1959–1961
 Jack Seale, 1961–1963
 F. V. Wallace, 1963–1967
 J. Ernest Stroud, 1967–1971
 L. Ray Vahue, 1971–1975
 John C. Drummond, 1975–1977
 Jerry H. Hodge, 1977–1981
 R. P. (Rick) Klein, 1981–1987
 Glen Parkey, 1987–1989
 Keith Adams, 1989–1993
 Kel Seliger, 1993–2001
 Trent Sisemore, 2001–2005
 Debra McCartt, 2005–2011
 Paul Harpole, 2011–2017
 Ginger Nelson, 2017–present

County, state, and federal representation
As the seat of Potter County, the city is the location of the county's trial, civil, and criminal courts. The Randall County Amarillo Annex building is located within the city limits and houses its Sheriff's Office and Justice of the Peace Court, Precinct 4.

The Texas Seventh Court of Appeals is located in Amarillo.

The Texas Department of Criminal Justice operates the Amarillo District Parole Office in the city. It also operates the Clements Unit and Nathaniel J. Neil Unit in unincorporated Potter County, east of Amarillo.

The United States Postal Service operates the Amarillo Main Post Office. Other post offices in the city include Downtown Amarillo, Jordan, Lone Star, North Amarillo, and San Jacinto.

In the U.S. House, Amarillo is located in Texas's 13th congressional district, and is represented by Representative Ronny Jackson. In the Texas Legislature, the city is in the 31st District in the Texas Senate, represented by Republican Kel Seliger, a former Amarillo mayor. It is in the 87th District in the Texas House of Representatives, having been represented by Republican David A. Swinford since 1991. Swinford retired in January 2011 and was succeeded by fellow Republican Four Price, who is the current representative. That part of Amarillo within Randall County is represented by Swinford's Republican colleague, John T. Smithee, who has served in the 86th District since 1985.

Education

According to the U.S. Census Bureau, 23.3% of all adults aged 25 and older have obtained a bachelor's degree, and 85% a high school diploma or equivalent from 2016 to 2020.

The higher education institutions in the city are Amarillo College, a two-year community college with over 10,000 students; Wayland Baptist University, a private university based in Plainview, has a branch campus in Amarillo; Texas Tech University Health Sciences Center at Amarillo Jerry H. Hodge School of Pharmacy, Texas Tech University Health Sciences Center at Amarillo School or Medicine and School of Health Professions and Texas Tech University at Amarillo, a branch campus of Texas Tech University that offers selected master's degree programs. West Texas A&M University, a regional university headquartered in nearby Canyon, has a campus building in downtown Amarillo.

Amarillo's primary and secondary education is handled by five different school districts:
 Amarillo ISD
 Bushland ISD
 Canyon ISD
 Highland Park ISD
 River Road ISD

Media

The major local newspaper is the Amarillo Globe-News, owned by GateHouse Media, was a combination of three newspapers: Amarillo Daily News, Amarillo Globe, and Amarillo Times. Other publications include a local monthly magazine dealing with city and regional issues in the Amarillo area called, Accent West and a daily online paper, The Amarillo Pioneer. The American Quarter Horse Association publishes two monthly publications, The American Quarter Horse Journal and The American Quarter Horse Racing Journal, HISPANIC Newspaper El Mensajero owned by Dr. Ramon Godoy started printing in 1989.

Amarillo's major network television affiliates are KACV-TV 2 (PBS), KAMR 4 (NBC), KVII 7 (ABC), KFDA 10 (CBS), KCIT 14 (Fox), and KCPN-LD 33 (MyNet). In the 2005–2006 television season, Amarillo is the 131st largest television market in the United States designated by Nielsen Media Research.

Amarillo is the 168th largest United States radio market in autumn 2005 designated by the radio audience research company, Arbitron. According to Arbitron the top 5 rated commercial radio stations in Fall 2012/Spring 2013 are:
 KXGL-FM − 100.9 FM- Classic Hits
 KGNC-FM − 97.9 FM- Country
 KGNC − 710 AM- News/Talk/Sports
 KXSS-FM − 96.9 FM- Top 40/CHR
 KQIZ-FM − 93.1 FM- Rhythmic Top 40/CHR
The regional public radio network, High Plains Public Radio, operates KJJP-FM 105.7. Other notable radio stations around the area include the college stations KACV-FM 89.9 (Amarillo College), Active Rock KZRK-FM (107.9), and KWTS-FM 91.1 (West Texas A&M University) in nearby Canyon.

Outside media attention
The city gained national media attention in 1998 when local cattlemen unsuccessfully sued television talk show host Oprah Winfrey for comments made on her show connecting American beef to mad cow disease, costing them and their industry millions of dollars. In order to attend the trial in Amarillo, she temporarily relocated her show to the Amarillo Little Theatre for nearly a year. During the trial, Winfrey hired Dallas-based jury consultant Phil McGraw to aid her attorneys on selecting and analyzing the members of the jury. McGraw would later become a regular guest on Winfrey's television show and subsequently started his own talk show, Dr. Phil, in 2002. Another notable trial in Amarillo includes the Fort Worth-area murder case of T. Cullen Davis, which involved one of the richest men in the United States, his former wife, and her daughter and boyfriend. The trial was moved from Fort Worth to Amarillo in 1977 on a change of venue. The 1997 murder of Brian Deneke and subsequent trial also brought national attention because it highlighted social divisions in the community that mirrored those in America as a whole. The defendant in the trial was convicted of voluntary manslaughter and received a light sentence. The movie Bomb City is based on the events surrounding Deneke's murder. Local civil rights attorney Jeff Blackburn took up the case of the Tulia defendants, which became a cause célèbre and resulted in the exoneration and pardon of the defendants. A federal lawsuit directed at the officials responsible for the sting operation was held in Amarillo. In the final settlement, the City of Amarillo agreed to pay $5 million in damages to the former Tulia defendants; disband the Panhandle Regional Narcotics Task Force that it set up to oversee the sting operation; and require early retirement for two Amarillo Police Department officers who were responsible for supervising the sting's sole undercover agent.

On May 5, 2020, Amarillo ranked 13th in the nation for Highest Average Daily Growth Rate of COVID-19 cases by the New York Times.

In popular culture

Amarillo has been mentioned in popular music such as George Strait's "Amarillo by Morning" by Paul Fraser and Terry Stafford (Stafford did his original version before Strait did his own cover), Mark Chesnutt's Blame It on Texas, Nat King Cole's "(Get Your Kicks on) Route 66", Bob Dylan's "Brownsville Girl" (Amarillo was referred to as the "land of the living dead"), Rob Zombie's "Two Lane Blacktop", "Amarillo Sky" by Jason Aldean, "A Quick Death In Texas" by Clutch, Marty Robbin's "Running Gun", and the song "Is This the Way to Amarillo" written by Neil Sedaka and Howard Greenfield, recorded famously by Yorkshireman Tony Christie and Sedaka, and revived in the UK by comedian Peter Kay through performances in the comedy series Peter Kay's Phoenix Nights and in a charity performance for Comic Relief. Christie's version, which only managed to reach 18 when originally released in 1971, made it to the number 1 spot in the UK Singles Chart in 2005 for 7 weeks. In 2010, Damon Albarn wrote the song "Amarillo" whilst on tour in America with the Gorillaz, although it is not known to what extent the song is reference to the city.

The Amarillo Film Commission is a division of the Amarillo Convention and Visitor Council that was created to provide film crews with locations and other assistance when filming in Amarillo. Amarillo was the setting for many motion pictures, including Indiana Jones and the Last Crusade, Switchback 1997, and The Plutonium Circus, the 1995 South by Southwest Film Festival winner for best documentary feature. Amarillo was the title of the third episode of the second season of AMC's drama Better Call Saul, a spin-off of the hit drama Breaking Bad. The city played a part in the plot of the episode, as it was a location used by series protagonist Jimmy McGill to solicit clients.

Infrastructure

Air transportation
A portion of the former Amarillo Air Force Base was converted to civilian use and became part of the airport. The airport was named after NASA astronaut Rick Husband, an Amarillo native and commander of the final flight of Space Shuttle Columbia, STS-107, which disintegrated on re-entry, killing Husband and his crewmates. The airport is served by several major air carriers with non-stop service to Dallas, Houston, Austin, Denver, Phoenix and Las Vegas.

Ground transportation
Local transit services in the city have been available since 1925 and have been provided through the City of Amarillo's Amarillo City Transit (ACT) department since 1966; before that time the system was privately owned. ACT operates bus services that include fixed route transit and demand response paratransit which are designed for people with disabilities. The ACT transports approximately 350,000 passengers per year on the fixed route and 30,000 paratransit passengers, but it is a declining ridership. ACT has no plans to scale back any of their transit routes or services.

Amarillo has no passenger rail service but remains an important part of the rail freight system. The last passenger train out of the city was the Santa Fe Railroad's San Francisco Chief, from Chicago, which had its last run in 1971. Previously, the Texas Zephyr to Denver and Dallas, last served Amarillo in 1967.

The BNSF Railway complex in Amarillo continues to serve a heavy daily traffic load, approximately 100–110 trains per day. The Union Pacific Railroad also sends substantial shipments to or through Amarillo. In addition to intermodal and general goods, a big portion of rail shipments involve grains and coal. There have been various proposals over the years to add passenger service. One, the Caprock Chief, would have seen daily service as part of a Fort Worth, Texas—Denver, Colorado service, but it failed to gain traction.

The streets in Amarillo's downtown area conform to a grid pattern. The city's original street layout was set up by William H. Bush, beginning at the west end of the town moving to the east. Bush named the north to south streets for past United States presidents, in chronological order except for John Quincy Adams because the surname was taken with the second president, John Adams. (The last president so honored was Grover Cleveland; though the city has expanded eastward, the pattern was not continued.) While the streets running north–south honor past presidents and are designated 'streets', east–west streets are numbered and are designated 'avenues'. North of the Fort Worth & Denver (now Burlington Northern-Santa Fe) railyard, the numbers are "NW" (northwest) west of Polk Street, and "NE" (northeast) east of Polk. South of the railyard (including the downtown-city center area), numbers are officially "SW" (southwest) west of Polk, and "SE" (southeast) east of Polk. Colloquially, though, most tend to dub the SW and SE avenues as W (west) and E (east), respectively. One example of the numbering difference regards the former U.S. Highway 66 routing west of downtown and into the San Jacinto neighborhood. Most call it 'West Sixth Street' when its actually SW Sixth Avenue.

In 1910, the Amarillo voters approved to pay for street paving and the materials used to pave the streets were bricks. As of 2003, the city still has  of brick streets in some parts of the downtown area. In 2002, the city spent $200,000 to restore one block of brick street on Ninth Avenue between Polk and Tyler streets.

Major highways
Amarillo is served by two interstate highways: Interstate 27 and Interstate 40.  Amarillo is also the northern terminus for I-27, of which less than one mile (~1.6 km) is located in Potter County. The highway terminates at the city's main west–east highway, Interstate 40, just north of the Potter–Randall county line. The roadway continues northward into downtown Amarillo via U.S. 60, 87, and 287, via a series of four one-way streets including Buchanan, Pierce, Fillmore and Taylor. North of downtown the highway becomes US 87 & 287 and continues northward to Dumas, Texas.

Interstate 40, the city's major east–west thoroughfare was completed entirely through Amarillo in November 1968 across the center of the city. Previously, U.S. Highway 66 was the major east–west highway through the city, generally following Amarillo Blvd. to the north of the downtown area and then curving southwest to leave the city near the Veterans Hospital. A city route (which was an original alignment of US 66 through central and west Amarillo) followed Fillmore south into the downtown area and turned on West 6th through the San Jacinto Heights district which is now home to many antique shops, restaurants and other businesses, passing the Amarillo Country Club and veering onto West 9th Street and Bushland Blvd before tying into the through route at a traffic circle near the Veterans Hospital.
Loop 335 circles around Amarillo in all four directions and consists of four-lane roadway on its northeast and southwest quadrants and two-lane paving to the southeast and northwest.

Amarillo is also mentioned in the song "Route 66".

Future freeways
In 2015, the Texas Department of Transportation (TxDOT) published the plans for the all new Loop 335 freeway that encircles the city of Amarillo. TxDOT has planned multiple multi-level interchanges that intersect with Interstate 40, Interstate 27, and U.S. 287 and 87. The first interchange, on the East side of Amarillo, is a multi-level interchange that provides access to both directions of the I-40 Expressway and Loop 335. On the northern side of Amarillo, the loop will be completely reconstructed to an Interstate-Grade freeway with complete grade separations and will be expanded to four lanes. It also includes a stack interchange that will connect the new freeway to the future I-27 Ports to Plains Corridor (Highway 287, 87). I-27 in Southern Amarillo will be entirely reconstructed from Buffalo Stadium Rd. at the Canyon E-Way Interchange to Palo Duro Canyon State Park. It will accommodate six lanes at the mainlane bridge along with a complete stack interchange with direct connectors to and from I-27. Furthermore, another triple-level interchange will be built to accommodate Soncy Road, Helium Road, I-27 and the new loop.  Also, another new mainlane bridge that accommodates up to six lanes is also in the works for I-40 near Helium Rd. providing easier access to the new freeway.  Although construction started in 2016, the entire project, which includes converting the entire loop to Interstate Specifications, is not expected to be complete until 2024.

Medical centers and hospitals

Amarillo is home to medical facilities including Baptist St. Anthony's and Northwest Texas Hospitals, the Don & Sybil Harrington Cancer Center, Bivins Memorial Nursing Home, Texas Tech University Health Sciences Center, Texas Tech School of Pharmacy, and Texas Panhandle Mental Health and Mental Retardation. All are located in the Harrington Regional Medical Center, the first specifically designated city hospital district in Texas.

Baptist St. Anthony's, known locally as BSA, had some of its services listed on the U.S. News & World Reports "Top 50 Hospitals" from 2002 to 2005. BSA was a result of a merger between the Texas Panhandle's first hospital, St Anthony's, with High Plains Baptist Hospital in 1996. The BSA Hospice & Life Enrichment Center provides important services to the Amarillo area. The BSA facility, opened in 1985, was the first free-standing hospice west of the Mississippi River to be built and opened without debt.

Northwest Texas Hospital is home to the area's only Level III designated trauma center.

The Thomas E. Creek Department of Veterans Affairs Medical Center is located east of Harrington Regional Medical Center. The facility opened in 1940 and was renamed in 2005, honoring the 18-year-old Amarillo Marine who was posthumously awarded the Medal of Honor. Construction began in 2006 for a new Texas State Veterans Home in northwest Amarillo. The United States government, through the Veterans Affairs Medical Center, provided the funding to build the facility, while the Texas government will run it after construction is completed. The Ussery-Roan Texas State Veterans Home opened in 2007.

Utilities
Drinking water is provided by the City of Amarillo and its Utilities Division. Amarillo's water supply used to come from both from Lake Meredith and the Ogallala Aquifer. Due to the lake's low water level, water is now only supplied by the aquifer. Lake Meredith is located northeast of Amarillo and in 2005 it contained at least  of water. By 2011, lake levels had dropped so much due to the Texas drought that the Canadian River Municipal Water Authority voted to stop using it entirely. Increased rainfall in recent years has helped the lake regain much of its volume.

Collection and disposal of the city's trash and garbage are the responsibilities of the City of Amarillo's Solid Waste Collection and Solid Waste Disposal Departments. Amarillo's non-hazardous solid waste is collected and disposed of through burial in the city's landfill. The City of Amarillo also operates recycling collection centers, one located near the downtown area and four at fire stations in the city. Other utilities are primarily provided by private organizations. Natural gas is distributed by Atmos Energy. Electric power service is distributed by Xcel Energy, through its wholly owned subsidiary, the Amarillo-based Southwestern Public Service Company. Wired telephone service is mainly provided by AT&T. Cable television is primarily provided by Suddenlink Communications.

See also

 List of museums in the Texas Panhandle
 List of notable people from Amarillo, Texas
 Teel Bivins

References

Further reading

  An illustrated history of the Queen City of the Texas Panhandle.

External links

 City of Amarillo
 Amarillo Chamber of Commerce
 Amarillo Convention and Visitor Council 
 Amarillo Economic Development Corp.
 Amarillo Area Parks
 Amarillo Public Library Photoarchive Collection – Displays historical pictures of Amarillo and the Texas Panhandle

 
Cities in Amarillo metropolitan area
Cities in Potter County, Texas
Cities in Randall County, Texas
Cities in Texas
County seats in Texas
Populated places established in 1887